"Love's Just a Feeling" is a single released in 2017 by violinist Lindsey Stirling featuring vocals from Rooty.

Background
"Love's Just a Feeling" was the final single released from Stirling's third album, Brave Enough. Available on the album since 2016, the single version and its accompanying video for the single were released in March 2017.

The recording was produced by Zedd, who also worked on the writing of the song.

Music video
A music video was released along with the single, directed by Stirling. It features Stirling being injected by a physician and entering a pod, where she has flashback memories to the 1950s with her partner, played by Brett Keating. She later emerges in the future, where a man gives her a red rose similarly to the one she was given by her partner earlier in the video. She returns, upset to the pod and emerges in a dystopian future, a robot brings her a rose and a man emerges from in the distance to hand it to her.

Charts
"Love's Just a Feeling" spent 17 weeks on the Billboard Adult Contemporary chart, peaking at number 22 in March 2018.

References

2017 singles
2016 songs
Lindsey Stirling songs
Songs written by Zedd
Songs written by Toby Gad
Songs written by Autumn Rowe
Songs written by Becky Hill
Songs written by Lindsey Stirling